Mae Tam may refer to several places in Thailand:

 Mae Tam, Chiang Rai
Mae Tam, Phayao